The Eagle is the final novel in the A Dream of Eagles series  (published in the United States as the Camulod Chronicles). The Eagle follows the continuing story of Clothar (Lancelot) from when he meets Arthur Pendragon, to, and possibly after, King Arthur's death. It also is noted for having a sympathetic portrait of Mordred.

The novel was released on November 19, 2005 in Canada and was released in the United States in 2007.

2005 British novels
Modern Arthurian fiction
Canadian fantasy novels
Novels set in sub-Roman Britain
Novels set in Anglo-Saxon England
Novels by Jack Whyte
Viking Press books